Vanessa Gabriela Pose Levy (born March 12, 1990)  is a Venezuelan actress.

Biography
Her father is Uruguayan and her mother is Cuban. She has a twin brother named Andrés and an older brother named Alejandro. She met actor Pedro Levy in 2011 and they got married in 2012. She gave birth to a baby girl in 2014.

Career
Pose had her first role in Con toda el Alma in 2005 as Maria Victoria Serrano and Camila Villafane as the Main Antagonist for the first 2 seasons she then departed from the series and Lorena Alvardo as Leticia La Madrid took her place for the third season, in 2006-2010 she appeared in Voltea pa' que te enamores, as Algeria Guzman until the show ended with a fifth season. In 2010 she got a role in Donde esta elisa as the Titular Protagonist  she announced her departure in mid 2010 but the  series still went on. In 2010-2011 she played Victoria "Vicky" hutton Miller in Aurora. In 2012- 2013 she played Emma Arroyo as the Co-Protagonist in Corazon Valiente later that year she departed from the series but came back in 2013 for the series finale. In 2013 she was supposed to play Patricia Ibarra on Marido en Alquiler but her pregnancy was unexpected and Kimberly Dos Ramos took the role instead but she did special guest star on the series.

Filmography

Films

Telenovelas

Webnovelas

References

External links

Venezuelan telenovela actresses
People from Caracas
Living people
Venezuelan people of Uruguayan descent
Venezuelan people of Cuban descent
Venezuelan twins
1990 births